Marc Stevens (September 2, 1943 – January 28, 1989)  was an American erotic performer. He is sometimes credited as Mark '10½' Stevens  or Mark Stevens.

Early life 
Marc Stevens was born Mark Kuttner in Brooklyn in 1943. He was the third of four children born to first generation Jewish parents Walter and Hannah. He attended Midwood High School in Brooklyn.

Career 
Stevens was a pioneering figure in the sex industry during the 1970s in New York City. He appeared in over 80 pornographic movies; he also led an erotic dance troupe titled Le Clique and performed in live sex shows.  He was bisexual, and while he predominantly appeared in heterosexual films and porn loops, he made a number of gay]films as well. He was a close associate of leading sex industry figures such as Jason and Tina Russell, Annie Sprinkle, Sharon Mitchell, Jamie Gillis, Georgina Spelvin, and Gloria Leonard. Tall and lean with a well-defined musculature, he had the nickname "10½" because of the supposed size of his circumcised penis.  He was famously photographed by Robert Mapplethorpe.

Notable films 
Notable films featuring Marc Stevens include:
 The Devil in Miss Jones
 All about Gloria Leonard
 Michael, Angelo and David

Honorable recognition 
Stevens was posthumously inducted into the XRCO Hall of Fame on April 30, 2008. He was inducted into the AVN Hall of Fame on January 26, 2019.

Death 
Stevens died of AIDS on January 28, 1989, aged 45 in New York City.

Despite his prominence in the 1970s and the fact he produced two memoirs (long out of print and allegedly ghost-written by his mother), titled 10½! and Making It Big,

See also 
 Golden Age of Porn
 List of male performers in gay porn films

References

External links 
 
 
 
 Mark Stevens' Party Invites

1943 births
1989 deaths
AIDS-related deaths in California
American male erotic dancers
American male adult models
American male pornographic film actors
Bisexual male pornographic film actors
Jewish American male actors
LGBT Jews
20th-century American male actors
20th-century American dancers
20th-century American Jews
20th-century American LGBT people